Brienza is a surname. Notable people with the surname include:

David M. Brienza (born 1964), American professor
Fabrizio Brienza (born 1969), Italian model and actor
Franco Brienza (born 1979), Italian footballer
Nicola Brienza (born 1980), Italian basketball coach

Italian-language surnames